Ambulyx marissa is a species of moth of the  family Sphingidae. It is known to be from Indonesia.

References

Ambulyx
Moths described in 2009
Moths of Indonesia